The Best Footballer in Asia award recognizes the best male footballer in Asia. Son Heung-min received the 6th annual award on 4 January 2019 for his play during the 2018 season. The event was judged by a panel of 44 sports journalists, and Son Heung-min won four of the six awards presented.

Voting
44 judges were invited to vote, including 35 representatives from AFC nations/regions which comprise Afghanistan, Australia, Bahrain, Bangladesh, Cambodia, China, Chinese Taipei, Hong Kong, India, Indonesia, Iran, Iraq, Japan, Jordan, Korea Republic, Kuwait, Kyrgyzstan, Lebanon, Macao, Malaysia, Myanmar, Oman, Palestine, Philippines, Qatar, Saudi Arabia, Singapore, Syria, Tajikistan, Thailand, Turkmenistan, United Arab Emirates, Uzbekistan, Vietnam and Yemen. The other nine jurors were independent Asian football experts or from well-known football media outlets. Before voting, all judges were given a 24-player shortlist, but could choose other eligible players.

Rules 
Each juror selects 5 best footballers and awards them 6, 4, 3, 2 and 1 point respectively from their first choice to the fifth choice. A trophy for the Best Footballer in Asia is awarded to the player with the highest total of points.

Tiebreakers
When two or more candidates obtain the same points, the rankings of the concerned candidates would be based upon the following criteria in order: 

a) The number of 1st-place vote obtained

b) The number of 2nd-place vote obtained

c) The number of 3rd-place vote obtained

d) The number of 4th-place vote obtained

If all conditions are equal, the concerned candidates tie. 

If the concerned candidates are tied for first place, the award and the trophy are shared.

Ranking
Source:

References 

2018
2018 awards
2018 in Asian football